Francis Howard Friend (February 17, 1898 - November 24, 1958) was an American politician from Maine. Friend served in the Maine House of Representatives (1920-1934) and Maine Senate (1935-1944). A Republican, Friend represented part of Somerset County, Maine, including his residence in Skowhegan. From 1940 to 1942, Friend served as Senate Majority Leader and was President of the special session called in 1942.

References

1898 births
1958 deaths
People from Skowhegan, Maine
Republican Party members of the Maine House of Representatives
Majority leaders of the Maine Senate
Presidents of the Maine Senate
Republican Party Maine state senators
20th-century American politicians